Nigel Harris may refer to:
Nigel Harris (actor) (born 1949), British actor
Nigel Harris (American football) (born 1994), American football player
Nigel Harris (economist) (born 1935), British economist
Nigel MacArthur, British broadcaster under the pseudonym Nigel Harris
Nigel Harris (editor) (born 1957), English journalist and media commentator